Derek Osonwa, professionally known as Dekumzy, is a Nigerian record producer, musician, composer, pianist, and songwriter. His first major production was the album of the Duo "Resonance" titled "Chinweike" in 2006. Since then he has gone forth to work with the likes of Mr Raw, Flavour N'abania, Bracket, Dr Alban, Charly Boy among others. His production credits include hits like "Baby Oku" by Flavour N'abania, "Strong and Mighty" by Mr Raw featuring Flavour N'abania, "Carolina Remix" by Dr Alban featuring Charly Boy, "No Time" by Bracket featuring P-Square, "Yori Yori Remix" by Bracket ft 2Baba.

Early life
Dekumzy was born in Enugu, Enugu State, Nigeria on 27 March 1983. He has family roots in Awka, Anambra State. He became active in music when he joined Federal Ex Students Christian Association (FECA) in the year 2000. He joined the choir at this point and started playing the keyboard. He founded the now defunct Girl Band Trio "Desperate Chicks" namely Stormrex, Ursula Ice and Barbie. One of them "Ursula Ice" eventually became his wife. Stormrex went solo. He has 2 sons

Career
His career highs includes the production of the theme song for the Nollywood Movie "A Million Tears" titled "Treasure" featuring Kate Henshaw. The production of the music collaboration between Dr Alban and Charly Boy on the remix of "Carolina" in 2009. The Production of 8 tracks from the second album of Bracket "Cupid Stories" in 2011. He has had a few stints as an artist which include the tracks "Who get dat thing" featuring Slowdog in 2010 and "Ashawoosa" in 2014.

Discography

As composer

Selected Feature films

References

External links 
 
 

Living people
1983 births
Musicians from Enugu
Nigerian record producers
Nigerian film score composers